The 24th ceremony of the Forqué Awards was held on 12 January 2019 at the Palacio de Congresos in Zaragoza. The gala was hosted by Elena S. Sánchez and Edu Soto.

History 
The nominations were disclosed in November 2019 at the Cine Doré.

Broadcast on La 1, the ceremony was held at the Palacio de Congresos in Zaragoza on 12 January 2019. The gala featured musical performances by Marta Sánchez, Carlos Baute, Ana Guerra and Blas Cantó.

 was gifted the EGEDA Gold Medal recognizing a career in the film industry.

Winners and nominees
The winners and nominees are listed as follows:

References

External links 
 Gala of the 24th Forqué Awards on RTVE Play

Forqué Awards
2019 film awards
2019 in Aragon
Zaragoza
January 2019 events in Spain